The Daughter of Japan is a 1935 Burmese black & white film directed by Nyi Pu. Its Japanese name is Nippon Musume. A1 film company produced this film with PCL Film Company in Japan, Tokyo. It opened on 30 November 1935 at the Bayin Cinema and the Olympia Cinema. In 1992 it was screened at the South East Asia Film festival held in Tokyo.

Cast
Nyi Pu as Maung Ba Htay
U. Tin Pe as Maung Maung Soe
San Nyunt as San Nyunt
Mitsuko Takao as Aye Mi San

References

1935 films
Burmese-language films
Films directed by Nyi Pu
Burmese black-and-white films